Maryborough railway station may refer to:

Maryborough railway station, Queensland
Maryborough railway station, Victoria
Maryborough West railway station, Queensland
Portlaoise railway station, Irish station formerly known as Maryborough